This is a list of the most important battles in the history of the nation of Georgia.

See also 

 List of wars involving Georgia (country)

 
Battles
Georgian
Battles